The 1st Delaware General Assembly was a meeting of the legislative branch of the state government, consisting of the Delaware Legislative Council and the Delaware House of Assembly. Elections were held the first day of October and terms began on the twentieth day of October. It met in the town of New Castle, Delaware, convening October 20, 1776, and was the administration of President John McKinly, effective on February 12, 1777. McKinly was captured by the British on September 22, 1777, and Thomas McKean replaced him until October 20, 1777.

The apportionment of seats was permanently assigned to three councilors and seven assemblymen for each of the three counties. Population of the county did not affect the number of delegates.

Leadership

Legislative Council
 George Read, New Castle County

House of Assembly
 John McKinly, New Castle County

Members

Legislative Council
Councilors were elected by the public for a three-year term, one third posted each year.

House of Assembly
Assemblymen were elected by the public for a one-year term. There were only seven representatives so two or three unidentified persons are unidentified of others.

References

Places with more information
 Delaware Historical Society; website; 505 North Market Street, Wilmington, Delaware 19801; (302) 655-7161
 University of Delaware; Library website; 181 South College Avenue, Newark, Delaware 19717; (302) 831–2965

0 001
1776 in Delaware
1777 in Delaware